Beneath Clouds is a 2002 film by Indigenous Australian director Ivan Sen. It is the feature film debut by the two lead actors. Damian Pitt was approached by Sen on the streets of Moree, New South Wales, and had never acted before. Dannielle Hall was cast through a more traditional method, via an audition tape. Much of the support cast were local residents from Pitt's hometown of Moree.

Plot synopsis
Lena has an absent Irish father she longs to see and an Aboriginal mother she finds disgusting. When she breaks away, she meets up with petty criminal Vaughn who's just escaped from low security prison to reluctantly visit his dying mother.
Blonde and light-skinned, Lena remains in denial about her Aboriginal heritage; Vaughn is an angry young man with a grudge against all whites. An uneasy relationship begins to form as they hit the road heading to Sydney, taking them on a journey that's as emotional as it is physical, as revealing as it is desperate.

Initially the two reluctant travelling companions are suspicious and wary of each other, but their journey, mostly by foot and the odd lift, builds an understanding between them.
The film follows its creator's (Ivan Sen's) own experiences growing up in Inverell, NSW with an Aboriginal mother and a European father who was not around.

Production
The film was financed by the New South Wales Film Commission and the Australian Film Finance Corporation.

Reception
Only two film critics have posted reviews on the Rotten Tomatoes, both positive. Urban Cinefile Critics commented "Displaying about equal amounts of naiveté, passion and talent, Beneath Clouds establishes Sen as a filmmaker of considerable potential". Andrew Howe of eCritic.com called it "One of the few feature films to canvass the issues facing the Aboriginal community from an adolescent perspective".

Accolades

Box office
 Beneath Clouds  grossed $548,416 at the box office in Australia.

See also
 List of Australian films
 Cinema of Australia

References

External links

Beneath Clouds at Oz Movies
 Samantha Fordham: Struggling to find their place: Indigenous youth, identity, and storytelling in Beneath Clouds and Samson & Delilah. Refractory: a Journal for Entertainment Media. Vol 18, May 2011, Screen and Cinema Studies, Department of Media and Communication, Swinburne University of Technology, 
 Beneath Clouds at the National Film and Sound Archive

2002 films
2000s drama road movies
Films set in New South Wales
Australian drama road movies
Films about Aboriginal Australians
Films shot in Australia
2002 drama films
Films directed by Ivan Sen
2000s English-language films